Margareta-Yvonne Barbu also known as Marga Barbu born Margareta-Yvonne Butuc (24 February 1929  – 31 March 2009) was a Romanian actress.

She was born in 1929 in Ocna Șugatag, Maramureș County, and moved to Bucharest at age 14. In 1950 she graduated from the I.L. Caragiale Institute of Theatre and Film Arts. She was married to actor Constantin Codrescu, and then to writer Eugen Barbu. She died at the Floreasca Hospital in Bucharest in 2009 and was buried with military honors at Bellu Cemetery, next to her second husband, on Writer's Alley, close to Mihai Eminescu's resting place.

Filmography
 Lacrimi de iubire (2005)... Polixenia  
 Lacrima cerului (1989)
 Martori dispăruți (1988)
 Totul se plătește (1986)
 Colierul de turcoaze (1985) .... Agatha Slătineanu... a.k.a. The Turquoise Necklace
 Domnișoara Aurica (1985) .... Aurica
 Masca de argint (1985)... a.k.a. The Silver Mask
 Misterele Bucureștilor (1983) ... a.k.a. Die Gelbe Rose und das Geheimnis von Bucharest or The Mysteries of Bucharest (International: English title: informal literal title)
 Wilhelm Cuceritorul (1982)... a.k.a.  (Romania) or Guillaume le conquérant (France) or William the Conqueror (USA)
 Trandafirul galben (1982) .... Agata Slatineanu... a.k.a. The Yellow Rose (International: English title: informal literal title)
 Drumul oaselor (1980) .... Agata Slatineanu
 Bietul Ioanide (1979)... a.k.a. Memories from an Old Chest of Drawers
 Omul care ne trebuie (1979)... a.k.a. The Man We Need
 Melodii, melodii... (1978)... a.k.a. Melodies, Melodies...
 Zile fierbinți (1976)... a.k.a. Hot Days
 Comoara din Carpați (1975) (TV)
 August în flăcări (1973) (TV)... a.k.a. August in Flames
  Tatăl risipitor (1973)... a.k.a. The Prodigal Father
 Ultimul cartuș (1973)... a.k.a. The Last Bullet
 La Révolte des Haîdouks (1972) TV series .... Anitza
 Dragostea începe vineri (1972)... a.k.a. Love Begins on Friday or Love Starts on Friday (International: English title: informal literal title)
 Facerea lumii (1971)... a.k.a. The Making of the World
 Saptamîna nebunilor (1971)... a.k.a. The Week of the Madmen
 Urmarirea (1971) TV series
 Haiducii lui Șaptecai (1970)... a.k.a. The Outlaws of Captain Anghel
  (1970)... a.k.a. The Dowry of Lady Ralu
  (1968) .... Anița... a.k.a. The Abduction of the Maidens
  (1968) .... Anița... a.k.a. The Revenge of the Outlaws
  (1967) .... Edith... a.k.a. Fingerprint
 Haiducii (1966)... a.k.a. The Outlaws
  (1966)... a.k.a. At the Gates of the Earth
  (1965)... a.k.a. White Trial
 Pădurea spânzuraților (1964)... a.k.a. Forest of the Hanged or The Lost Forest
  (1957) ... a.k.a. Eagle 101 (International: English title: informal literal title)
 Răsare soarele (1954)... a.k.a. The Sun Rises (USA)
 Nepoții gornistului (1953)... a.k.a. The Bugler's Grandsons

References

External links
 
 

1929 births
2009 deaths
People from Maramureș County
Caragiale National University of Theatre and Film alumni
Romanian film actresses
Burials at Bellu Cemetery